The 153 megawatt (MW) capacity Walnut Wind Farm is located in Pottawattamie County, Iowa. The project, owned by MidAmerican, represents the fifth wind farm built for the group for a total of 595 MW and began operations on February 19, 2009.

See also

Wind power in the United States
List of onshore wind farms

References

Energy infrastructure completed in 2009
Buildings and structures in Pottawattamie County, Iowa
Wind farms in Iowa